Manjay Lal (2 January 1925, Rampur Bakhari, Muzaffarpur, Bihar - 29 April 2007 Patna, Bihar, India) was an Indian politician from Janata Dal (United). He has served as member of the Lok Sabha (House Of The People) representing Samastipur (Lok Sabha constituency). He was elected to 9th, 10th and 13th Lok Sabha. Lal was also the Member of the Legislative Assembly in Muzaffarpur from 1977 to 1980.

Positions held 
1970-1976 - Member, Bihar Legislative Council

1977-1979 - Member, Bihar Legislative Assembly, Minister of State for Personnel and Transport, Bihar; Secretary, Socialist Party, Secretary, Praja Socialist Party, Bihar Vice-President, Lok Dal, Bihar Executive Member, Praja Socialist Party, Bihar Member, Public Accounts Committee, Bihar Legislative Assembly

1984-1989 - Member, Bihar Legislative Council

1989 - Elected to 9th Lok Sabha

1990 - Member, Public Accounts Committee; Member, Consultative Committee, Ministry of Agriculture

1991 - Re-elected to 10th Lok Sabha (2nd term)

1994-1999 - All India General Secretary, Samata Party (Uday Mandal is current President) Member, Central Parliamentary Board, Janata Dal Member, National Executive, Janata Dal

1999 - Re-elected to 13th Lok Sabha (3rd term)

1999-2000 - Member, Committee on Industry Member, Committee on Estimates

2000-2004 - Member, Consultative Committee, Ministry of Steel

References

India MPs 1991–1996
1925 births
2007 deaths
India MPs 1989–1991
India MPs 1999–2004
Lok Sabha members from Bihar
Bihar MLAs 1977–1980
Members of the Bihar Legislative Council
State cabinet ministers of Bihar
People from Muzaffarpur
Bharatiya Lok Dal politicians
Janata Dal (United) politicians
Janata Dal politicians
Praja Socialist Party politicians
Samata Party politicians